Eggbert may refer to:

 Eggbert (1994 video game), a game for the MSX 2, and inspiration of the game Toki Tori
 Speedy Eggbert, a 1998 PC game developed by EPSITEC